National Highway 114A, commonly referred to as NH 114A is a national highway in  India. It is a spur road of National Highway 14. NH-114A traverses the states of West Bengal and Jharkhand in India.

Route 
Rampurhat, Sunrichua, Shikaripara, Dumka, Lakrapahari, Jama, Jarmundi, Choupa More, Deoghar, Sarath, Madhupur, Giridih, Dumri.

Junctions  

  terminal near Rampurhat.
  near Choupa More.
  near Deoghar.
  terminal near Dumri, Giridih.

See also 

 List of National Highways in India by highway number
 List of National Highways in India by state

References

External links 

 NH 114A on OpenStreetMap

National highways in India
Transport in Birbhum district
National Highways in West Bengal
National Highways in Jharkhand